"Judgement Day" is a song by American hip hop recording artist Method Man, released October 20, 1998 as the first single and twenty-seventh track from his second studio album, Tical 2000: Judgement Day (1998). It is the last full song on the album. The introduction of the track is based on the opening of the 1989 film Cyborg.

Music video
A music video also has been made for the song which is inspired by his album cover, Tical 2000: Judgement Day.

References

1998 singles
1998 songs
Method Man songs
Def Jam Recordings singles
Hardcore hip hop songs
Songs written by Method Man